Skålvik Fjord (also Skaalvik Fjord) is an arm of Vinje Fjord in the municipality of Halsa in Møre og Romsdal County, Norway, in the traditional Nordmøre district. Skålvik Fjord extends  southwards to Betna. Geologically, the same channel of the fjord extends north of Vinje Fjord and continues as the Sålå Strait (Sålåsundet) in the Municipality of Aure.

The entrance to the fjord lies between the Korsneset peninsula to the west and the hamlet of Steinstien to the east. Between Vågland and Klevset on the opposite shore there are several islands and islets in the fjord. There is a boatyard (Vaagland Båtbyggeri AS) in Vågland.

The village of Betna lies at the southwest end of the fjord, above Betna Bay (Betnvågen). Reit Bay (Reitvågen) lies on the other side, just east of Halsa. Reit Bay has two beaches; these were designated as the Reit Bay Nature Reserve (Reitvågen naturreservat) in 2002.

In 2002, the orca Keiko appeared in Skålvik Fjord, resulting in extensive media coverage.

References

Fjords of Møre og Romsdal